Okinai Dam  is an earthfill dam located in Hokkaido Prefecture in Japan. The dam is used for flood control and irrigation. The catchment area of the dam is 16.4 km2. The dam impounds about 14  ha of land when full and can store 1189 thousand cubic meters of water. The construction of the dam was started on 1976 and completed in 1995.

References

Dams in Hokkaido